Nashe Township is a township in Bama Yao Autonomous County, Guangxi, China.

Administrative division
As of 2016, the township is divided into seven villages: 
 Donglie  
 Daluo  
 Nashe  
 Gong'ai  
 Nayi  
 Naqin  
 Xianglan

Geography
The township is located in western Bama Yao Autonomous County. It borders Fengshan County in the north, Jiazhuan Town in the east, Suoluo Township in the southwest.

Economy
The economy is supported primarily by agriculture, forestry and mineral resources. The main crops of the region are grains, followed by corns and cassava. Camellia oleifera is the economic plant of this region. The region abounds with gold, copper, iron, manganese and coal.

Tourist attractions
The Crystal Palace of the Dragon King is a karst cave and famous scenic spot in the county.

References

Bibliography
 

Townships of Hechi
Divisions of Bama Yao Autonomous County